Hambledon may refer to:
 Hambledon, Hampshire, England
Hambledon Club, was a notable progenitor of the game of cricket
 Hambledon, Surrey, England
 Hambledon Hill, Dorset, England
 , the name of more than one ship of the British Royal Navy

See also 
 Hambleden, Buckinghamshire, England
 Hambleden Lock
 Hambleden Mill
 Hambleton (disambiguation)